Continental High School is a public high school in Continental, Ohio.  It is the only high school in the Continental Local Schools district.  Their nickname is the Continental Pirates, due to their mascot being a Pirate.  They are a member of the Putnam County League.

References

External links
 District Website

High schools in Putnam County, Ohio
Public high schools in Ohio